Shehryar Malik is a Pakistani politician who was a Member of the Provincial Assembly of the Punjab, from April 2017 to May 2018.

Political career

He was elected to the Provincial Assembly of the Punjab as a candidate of Pakistan Muslim League (Nawaz) from Constituency PP-23 (Chakwal-IV) in by polls held in April 2017.

References

Living people
Punjab MPAs 2013–2018
Pakistan Muslim League (N) politicians
Year of birth missing (living people)